Eden Hason (born August 25, 1994) is an Israeli singer-songwriter and record producer.

Biography
Eden Hason was born in Pardes Hanna-Karkur to a religious family of Sephardic roots (Algerian Jewish). His father Yoram, is a truck driver and his mother Esther, is a kindergarten teacher. During his military service, he served at the Air Force Base in Mitzpe Ramon, where he was part of an emergency squad.

Music career

Hason released his first song Shemishehu Yaatzor Oti. The song has been very successful and is ranked fourth in the Galgalatz 2018 Song of the Year. Hason also won the piece with the ACUM's "Song of the Year" award in 2019. On April 4, 2019, his debut album was released.

Discography
Shemishehu Yaatzor Oti (2019)
Album 2 (2021)

References

External links
 Facebook
 YouTube

21st-century Israeli male singers
1994 births
Living people
People from Pardes Hanna-Karkur
Israeli record producers
Israeli people of Algerian-Jewish descent